James Jones is a British director who makes documentary films for international television and theatrical release.

Career 
James Jones is a two-time Emmy Award-winning and five-time BAFTA-nominated director. His films are broadcast around the world, primarily on the BBC, Channel 4 and PBS Frontline.

Jones has tackled difficult subjects like suicide in the military and homelessness. He has also made films in some of the most difficult places in the world, like North Korea and Saudi Arabia. His film Children of the Gaza War was broadcast on the BBC in July 2015 on the first anniversary of the 2014 Gaza war. In 2016 he made the critically acclaimed feature-length documentary Unarmed Black Male about the murder trial of a police officer in Portsmouth, Virginia. In 2017 he co-directed the Emmy-winning Mosul with Olivier Sarbil.

In 2019 he released a feature documentary on the drug war in the Philippines – On The President's Orders - for FRONTLINE PBS, Arte France, BBC Storyville and Bertha Doc Society. The film received rave reviews in Variety and other publications after playing at Hot Docs festival in Toronto. It played at the Sheffield DocFest and Human Rights Watch Film Festival in New York.

In 2022 his film Chernobyl: The Lost Tapes was broadcast on Sky Documentaries. It told the story of the Chernobyl disaster using personal interviews with people who were there and newly discovered, dramatic footage filmed at the nuclear plant, most of it never seen before in the West.

His films have won two Emmys, two DuPonts, a Grierson, a Rory Peck, a Royal Television Society, a Broadcast Award, two Overseas Press Club of America, two Golden Nymphs, and have been nominated five times at the BAFTAs.

Filmography

References

External links
 Jones Films website

Living people
British documentary filmmakers
Year of birth missing (living people)
Place of birth missing (living people)